Matthew Steven LeBlanc (born July 25, 1967) 
is an American actor. He garnered global recognition with his portrayal of Joey Tribbiani in the NBC sitcom Friends and in its spin-off series, Joey. For his work on Friends, LeBlanc received three nominations at the Primetime Emmy Awards. He has also starred as a fictionalized version of himself in Episodes (2011–2017), for which he won a Golden Globe Award and received four additional Emmy Award nominations. He co-hosted Top Gear from 2016 to 2019. From 2016 to 2020, he played patriarch Adam Burns in the CBS sitcom Man with a Plan.

Early life 
LeBlanc was born in Newton, Massachusetts. His mother, Patricia (née Di Cillo), was an office manager; his father, Paul LeBlanc, was a mechanic. His father is of French-Canadian descent and his mother is of Italian ancestry. He attended Newton North High School, where he graduated in the same year as future comedian Louis C.K. After high school he attended college at Wentworth Institute of Technology in Boston. He dropped out shortly after starting his second semester.

LeBlanc moved to New York at the age of 17 to pursue a career in modeling, but he was told he was too short to be in the industry. His acting career began after a woman invited him to accompany her to an audition, where he ended up getting signed by her manager. Although he had booked commercials and television and film roles before Friends, he was reportedly down to his last eleven dollars before landing the role of Joey Tribbiani.

Career

1987–1994: Early career 

LeBlanc first appeared in a 1987 Heinz Tomato Ketchup commercial. In 1988, he starred in the television drama TV 101 for one season. In 1991, he had a recurring role on the hit Fox sitcom Married... with Children. He played Vinnie Verducci, a family friend of protagonist Al Bundy (Ed O'Neill) who briefly dates his daughter, Kelly (Christina Applegate). He also guest-starred in the first season of Red Shoe Diaries. LeBlanc went on to star in two short-lived Married... with Children spin-offs: Top of the Heap (1991) and Vinnie & Bobby (1992).

He appeared in two Bon Jovi music videos: "Miracle," from the Young Guns II soundtrack in 1990, and "Say It Isn't So" in 2000. He also appeared in videos for Alanis Morissette's single "Walk Away," and Bob Seger's "Night Moves".

1994–2004: Friends 
LeBlanc found success as the dimwitted but lovable Joey Tribbiani on Friends; he played this character for 12 years — 10 seasons of Friends and two seasons of Joey. Friends was wildly successful, and LeBlanc (along with co-stars Jennifer Aniston, Courteney Cox-Arquette, Lisa Kudrow, Matthew Perry, and David Schwimmer) gained wide recognition among viewers. This ensemble situation comedy became a major hit for NBC, airing on Thursday nights for ten years.

For his performance, LeBlanc received three Primetime Emmy Award nominations, three Golden Globe award nominations, and one Screen Actors Guild Award nomination. During this time he also appeared in the films Lookin' Italian (1994), Ed (1996), Lost in Space (1998), Charlie's Angels (2000), and its sequel, Charlie's Angels: Full Throttle (2003).

2006–2011: Hiatus 
Following the cancellation of Joey, Matt LeBlanc announced that he would be taking a one-year hiatus from acting on television, which eventually turned into five years.

2011–present: Career revival 

From 2011, LeBlanc appeared as a fictionalized version of himself in Episodes, a television series about an American remake of a fictional British television series. The series is written by Friends co-creator David Crane and his partner Jeffrey Klarik. At the 69th Golden Globe Awards in 2012, LeBlanc won the Golden Globe Award for Best Actor in a television series, musical, or comedy, and was nominated for an additional four Primetime Emmy Awards.

In February 2012, LeBlanc appeared in the second episode of the eighteenth series of Top Gear, where he set the fastest lap time in the "Star in a Reasonably Priced Car" segment in a Kia Cee'd. Lapping at 1:42.1, he beat the show's previous record-holder, Rowan Atkinson, by 0.1 seconds. He also appeared in the fourth episode of the nineteenth season to race the New Kia Cee'd, and beat his previous time.

In February 2016, the BBC announced LeBlanc had signed on to become one of the new Top Gear hosts, signing a two-year deal later that year. He announced his decision to retire from the series in May 2018, having co-hosted it for three years. Despite the show being "great fun", he stated the "time commitment and extensive travel takes me away from my family and friends more than I'm comfortable with."

LeBlanc played the lead role in the CBS sitcom Man with a Plan, which began airing in 2016 until it was cancelled in 2020.

Personal life 
LeBlanc has an extensive interest in cars, and worked as a carpenter before acting.  He married Melissa McKnight, a British-born American model and a divorced single mother of two children, in May 2003. In 1997, they were introduced to each other by McKnight's friend, Kelly Phillips (wife of actor Lou Diamond Phillips). LeBlanc proposed to her a year later. Their daughter, born in 2004, began suffering seizures at eight months old. By the time she was two years old, the condition, thought to be a form of dysplasia, had mostly subsided. LeBlanc and McKnight divorced in October 2006, citing irreconcilable differences.

LeBlanc met actress Andrea Anders in 2004 while she was co-starring as his friend and eventual love interest on Joey and the pair eventually embarked on a relationship which was confirmed in 2006 following LeBlanc's split from his wife  Melissa McKnight. After over eight years as a couple, LeBlanc announced at the start of 2015 that he and Anders had been broken up for several months.

LeBlanc primarily resides in Pacific Palisades, Los Angeles.

Filmography

Film

Television

Awards and nominations

References

External links 

 
 
 
 
 

1967 births
20th-century American male actors
21st-century American male actors
Actors from Newton, Massachusetts
American expatriates in the United Kingdom
American male film actors
American male television actors
American people of French-Canadian descent
American people of Italian descent
American people of French descent
Best Musical or Comedy Actor Golden Globe (television) winners
Living people
Male actors from Massachusetts
Newton North High School alumni
People from Hidden Hills, California
Top Gear people